Australia's Amateur Hour was an important early Australian radio and television program in the form of a talent contest, which was broadcast from 1940 to 1958, which also aired briefly on television from 1957 to 1958.

The radio version was originally compered by radio producer Harry Dearth, then by Dick Fair, and finally by Terry Dear (1913-1995). It was a popular, long-running program on which many performers appeared.

The television version was compered by Terry Dear, and ran from August 1957 to February 1958. It aired on the Nine Network (TCN-9) and the Seven Network (HSV-7).

The success of the radio version didn't translate to television, with the television version closing after only seven months, and the radio version shortly thereafter.

Episode status
Some episodes of the radio version are held by the National Film & Sound Archive. Although the television version was kinescoped so it could be shown in both Sydney and Melbourne, it is not known if any such recordings still exist today.

See also 

 List of Australian music television shows

References

External links

Seven Network original programming
Nine Network original programming
Australian radio programs
1957 Australian television series debuts
1958 Australian television series endings
Black-and-white Australian television shows
English-language television shows
Australian variety television shows
Television series based on radio series